Argyrothelaira is a genus of flies in the family Tachinidae.

Species
 Argyrothelaira froggattii Townsend, 1916
 Argyrothelaira melancholica (Mesnil, 1944)

References

Exoristinae
Tachinidae genera
Diptera of Australasia
Taxa named by Charles Henry Tyler Townsend